Nitish Jain (born 15 February 1961) is an Indian educationist, philanthropist, and President of S P Jain School of Global Management (S P Jain), a global business school that has campuses in Dubai, Singapore, Sydney and Mumbai. Under Nitish’s leadership, S P Jain is credited with pioneering a multi-city learning model and developing a proprietorial software for the delivery of online education. 

Nitish is the recipient of several awards in recognition of his efforts in modernising business education and promoting global employability among business graduates. In 2010, he won the Outstanding Contribution to Education Award by the CMO Asia, and the Award for Excellence by the Australia India Business Council in 2014, presented by Her Excellency Julie Bishop, Minister for Foreign Affairs, Australia.

Nitish is recognised as having global impact in the education sector. In 2014, he was selected by the Indian Prime Minister Narendra Modi to join his official delegation of CEOs to Australia post the G20 summit. Over three days, Nitish, along with other chief executive officers, business leaders and visionaries from India, joined the PM in presenting his "Make in India" campaign to Australia's business community.

In 2016, Nitish was named 'Game Changer in Education' in Forbes magazine's Middle East edition and subsequently in 2017, by the CEO Middle East.

Early life and education 
Nitish is the son of the late Dr S C Jain and Neera Jain, and grandson of the late Shreyans Prasad Jain, parliamentarian, industrialist, and philanthropist who was conferred the Padma Bhushan in 1988. Nitish, and his brother Vivek, were raised in Mumbai and educated at the Cathedral and John Connon School. He pursued his undergraduate degree from Sydenham College, Mumbai University, and an MBA from Cornell University, USA.

S P Jain School of Global Management 

Although Nitish was closely associated with education from an early age, his most notable achievement was the founding of SP Jain School of Global Management, a business school named after his grandfather. After founding the school in Dubai in 2004, Nitish went on to set up three other international campuses for SP Jain in Singapore, Sydney, and most recently, Mumbai, India.    

By having campuses in four of the world's top financial and business centres, Nitish and SP Jain were able to successfully introduce multi-city residential undergraduate and postgraduate programs, including a top-ranked Global MBA program. The school also offers an award-winning executive MBA program, a doctoral program for senior business professionals and a number of executive education and short-term online programs.   

Nitish's contributions, impact in EdTech and leadership have led to SP Jain's ranking among the world's best by:
 Forbes (2019-21): ranked in the World's Top 15 
 Forbes (2017–19): ranked in the World's Top 20
 The Economist (2015): ranked in the Global Top 100 in the World
 Forbes, USA: Best International 1 Year programs (2015–2016): ranked #10 in the world
 Poets and Quants, USA (2015)>|: ranked #33 in the world
 Forbes, USA: Best International Business School (2013–2014): ranked #19 in the world (outside the US)
 Nielsen (2014): no. 1 MBA salary audit in U. A. E.
 Financial Times, UK (2011 and 2012): top 100 Global MBA Programs in the world

Engaged Learning Online 

In 2018, under Nitish's leadership, SP Jain launched Engaged Learning Online, a proprietary online learning platform that allows professors to make eye contact and interact with students in a setting similar to a physical classroom—even in a class of 70 students. The platform uses artificial intelligence, big data, emotion recognition systems and robotics to deliver a real-time online learning experience for students who could be at their homes or work. 
 
Central to the technology is a physical studio called the ELO Room, from where professors physically conduct their classes. The ELO Room has 20 large-screen TV monitors set up in an arc. As students log in, professors get a view of them sitting as though in the first row of the class. The ELO Room is set up with a robotic tracking camera that allows the professors to move freely, maintain eye contact with students, respond to their visual cues, moderate discussions, and more. 

In 2020, the platform won the Best Tech for Education Award at the India Digital Enabler Awards (I.D.E.A) 2020, hosted by Entrepreneur India.

In the media 
As a thought leader in education, Nitish has been interviewed by international publications and broadcast media like the Sydney Morning Post, Bloomberg TV (Hong Kong and India), BBC (Singapore), Zee TV (Singapore), Khaleej Times (Dubai), and Channel 9 News and the Australian (Australia). He has been an invited keynote speaker at international conferences, such as 2017 EFMD Global Network Asia Annual Conference held in Indonesia on the theme of 3D Management in Education: Quality, Technology and Future Leadership and the 2nd World Disruptive Innovation Summit 2019 in Singapore.

Awards and honours

Board memberships 
Nitish is active in several professional societies including the FICCI and the Young President's Association. In addition, he contributes actively to social causes and is a Trustee of Sukhanand Ashram (Dharamshala) Trust, Seth Sukhanand Gurumukhrai Trust, DCW Ltd. Trust and the S P Jain Welfare Foundation. Many of these Trusts were founded by his family with the objective of promoting education and medical welfare among low-income families.

Personal life 

Nitish is married to Bapsy Jain, bestselling author and entrepreneur. Together, they have two sons, Samarth and Gaurav.

References

External links
 S P Jain School of Global Management - Dubai, Mumbai, Singapore & Sydney
 Mr Nitish Jain discussing - Assessing the Value of an MBA with Bloomberg
 
 
 Game Changer Forbes Middle East

Businesspeople from Mumbai
1961 births
Living people
S P Jain School of Global Management